The 2008 American Le Mans Series season was the 38th season for the IMSA GT Championship, with the tenth season known as the American Le Mans Series. It was a series for Le Mans Prototypes (LMP) and Grand Tourer (GT) race cars divided into four classes: LMP1, LMP2, GT1, and GT2. It began March 15 and ended October 18 after eleven races.

The Audi Sport North America team wrapped up its title defence of LMP1 class Teams Championship with three races in hand after the Sports Car Challenge of Mid-Ohio in August. Drivers Marco Werner and Lucas Luhr also secured the Drivers Championship after the Detroit Sports Car Challenge. It was a record fifth ALMS drivers title for Luhr and a fourth for Werner.

The Petit Le Mans saw the drivers title for GT1 decided with Jan Magnussen and Johnny O'Connell taking the title while Jörg Bergmeister and Wolf Henzler likewise secured the GT2 drivers championship. It was O'Connell's fourth GT1 title and Bergmeisters third GT2 title.

Schedule

The Lone Star Grand Prix was originally scheduled to take place on April 26. However, following the merger of the Champ Car World Series and Indy Racing League, the Champ Car Grand Prix of Houston event was initially cancelled. The American Le Mans Series race, as well as the support races, were later cancelled on March 3.

Season results

Overall winner in bold.

Teams championships

For races under three hours, points are awarded to the top 10 finishers in the following order:
 20-16-13-10-8-6-4-3-2-1
For races between four hours and eight hours, points are awarded in the following order:
 25-21-18-15-13-11-9-8-7-6
For races longer than eight hours, points are awarded in the following order:
 30-26-23-20-18-16-14-13-12-11

Cars failing to complete 70% of the winner's distance are not awarded points. Unlike the Le Mans Series where teams with multiple entries have each entry number scored separately to the championship, teams with multiple entries only score the points of their highest finishing entry in each race.

LMP1 standings

LMP2 standings

GT1 standings

GT2 standings

Drivers championship

For races under three hours, points are awarded to the top 10 finishers in the following order:
 20-16-13-10-8-6-4-3-2-1
For races between four hours and eight hours, points are awarded in the following order:
 25-21-18-15-13-11-9-8-7-6
For races longer than eight hours, points are awarded in the following order:
 30-26-23-20-18-16-14-13-12-11

Cars failing to complete 70% of the winner's distance are not awarded points.  Drivers failing to drive for at least 45 minutes in the race are not awarded points, with the exception of the Long Beach round where drivers need only 30 minutes minimum.

LMP1 standings

† - Frank Biela and Emanuele Pirro were both penalized three championship points for their entry making avoidable contact during Round 4.

LMP2 standings

† - Sascha Maassen and Patrick Long were both penalized three championship points for their entry making avoidable contact during Round 2.

GT1 standings

GT2 standings

Partial season entries
 Team Cytosport, following a partnership with Charouz Racing System and Team Jota to run in the Le Mans Series and 24 Hours of Le Mans, plans to return to the ALMS at Mid-Ohio
 Although Team ECO attempted to run their diesel-powered Radical SR10 LMP1 at Sebring, homologation problems have forced the team to delay their debut until Mid-Ohio.
 Autocon Motorsports will run a partial schedule, skipping most street circuit rounds, to concentrate on their bid for the 24 Hours of Le Mans.  Their car will be upgraded to full CA07 specification by Le Mans.

Green Challenge
On June 24, 2008, the ALMS has announced for a new challenge called the Green Challenge. The challenge, integrated with the series races, and which will debut at this year's Petit Le Mans, and continuing with the entire full season in 2009, emphasizes on targeting the series for "green racing." The ALMS was the first motorsport racing series in North America to be recognized by the United States Environmental Protection Agency (the EPA), the United States Department of Energy and the Society of Automotive Engineers (SAE International) to be recognized as a "Green Racing Series", and these three will take part organizing the challenge. All the teams will be eligible for the Green Challenge. The point system will be the same as the regular ALMS scoring system, but teams start out with the most possible points a team in the ALMS have during the season, and the points are deducted based on the performance of the vehicle. The lowest points at the end of the season would be the Green Challenge season champion.

References

External links
 American Le Mans Series

American Le Mans Series seasons
Le Mans Series
American Le Mans Series
 
American